The Gulfstream Park Mile Stakes (formerly known as the Gulfstream Park Handicap) is a race for thoroughbred horses run at Gulfstream Park each year. The race is open to horses age four and up, willing to race one mile on the dirt. A Grade II event run in early March, it currently offers a purse of $200,000.

History
The Gulfstream Park Handicap was first run in 1946. It was won the next year in track record time by Armed, dubbed "the greatest attraction ever offered at his young seaside course" by the New York Times. In 1948 Rampart became the first female horse to win the race, defeating Armed at odds of 26–1.

Graded stakes race status:
Grade II : 1973–1974, 2003–present
Grade 1 : 1975–2002

In 1997, Barbara Minshall became the first female trainer to win the race in its fifty-two-year history.

As part of his record seven wins of this race, Hall of Fame jockey Jerry Bailey won this race four times in a row from 1995 through 1998.

The distance of the race was set at one mile in 2009. It was run at  miles from 2005 to 2008, and at  miles before that time.

Records
Speed  record:
 1 mile – 1:33.80 – Palace Malice (2014)
  miles – 1:54.74 – Eddington (2005)
  miles – 1:59.00 – Mat-Boy (1984)

Most wins:
 2 – Crafty Admiral (1952, 1953)
 2 – Skip Trial (1986, 1987)
 2 – Behrens (1999, 2000)

Most wins by a jockey:
 7 – Jerry Bailey (1977, 1988, 1990, 1995, 1996, 1997, 1998)

Most wins by a trainer:
 5 – Todd Pletcher (2006, 2014, 2015, 2016, 2021)

Winners 

* In 1962, Yorky won the race but was disqualified and set back to second place.

See also 
 Gulfstream Park Handicap top three finishers and starters

References

External links
 The Gulfstream Park Handicap at Pedigree Query

Graded stakes races in the United States
Horse races in Florida
Open middle distance horse races
Gulfstream Park
Recurring sporting events established in 1946
1946 establishments in Florida